Christopher O'Connell (born 3 June 1994) is an Australian professional tennis player. He grew up on the Northern Beaches of Sydney. O'Connell reached a career high ATP singles ranking of World No. 78 on 28 November 2022 and a doubles ranking of No. 460 on 25 April 2022. He made his ATP Tour debut in January 2017 in his hometown at the Sydney International.

Career

2011–16: Professional career beginnings
O'Connell played his first ITF Men's Circuit match in October 2011, where he defeated Robert Howe in the Australia F8 before being defeated in the second round. O'Connell ended 2011 with a ranking of 1745. In 2012, O'Connell lost in the first round of qualifying for the Caloundra Challenger while attending the Australian Institute of Sport on a tennis scholarship. He played two more ITF tournaments in Asia before having an 22-month hiatus from professional tennis.

In 2014, O'Connell was given a wild card into the qualifying rounds of the 2014 McDonald's Burnie International, where he qualified and made the quarter-final. He then played a series of ITF tournaments across Australia before travelling to Europe. In June 2014, he played in and won his first ITF Men's Circuit final in Bol, Croatia. He returned to Australia and played in the Latrobe City Traralgon ATP Challenger. He ended 2014 with a ranking of 487. In 2015, O'Connell played sporadically on the ITF and Challenger circuits across Australia and Asia, without a title. His best result was a quarter-final result at Gimcheon Challenger. Also in 2015, O'Connell worked in his hometown of Sydney, Australia to save money. He ended 2015 the year with a ranking of 567.

In 2016, O'Connell won five ITF Futures titles across Australia and Europe. In December 2016, O'Connell said; “I decided this year just to play a lot of matches. I think I've played over 80 matches this year and I've predominantly been in Europe - I was there for about seven months just playing week-in and week-out on the clay so I've got a lot match fitness and experience.”  Massively improving his ranking in 2016, O'Connell finished the year ranked 237.

2017–18: Major & ATP debuts, injury struggles, severe drop in rankings
In January 2017, O'Connell made his ATP World Tour debut after qualifying for the Sydney International in his hometown. He was defeated in the first round by Portugal's Gastão Elias. O'Connell then received a wildcard for the 2017 Australian Open where he lost his first round match in straight sets to (then) world number 15 Grigor Dimitrov in his Grand Slam debut. O'Connell then competed in the Burnie and Launceston challengers, before competing on the ATP Challenger Tour across Asia, Europe and North America with limited success. In October, O'Connell qualified for and reached the semi-final of the Fairfield Challenger. O'Connell finished 2017 with a singles ranking of 393.

The 2018 season was interrupted by a knee injury for O'Connell  where he was only able to play 24 matches across the Futures, Challenger and ATP World Tours finishing the year with a singles ranking of 1185.

2019: Return from injury and first Challenger title
O'Connell began the year receiving wildcards into Qualifying for both the 2019 Brisbane International and 2019 Sydney International, losing to Christian Garin and Guido Andreozzi respectively.

After the controversial restructuring of the ITF/ATP points system and the launch of the ITF World Tour, O'Connell returned to the Futures circuit to start his 2019 season. Playing on clay, he made consecutive finals in Mornington before travelling to Europe to play in tournaments in Turkey and Bosnia and Herzegovina, winning titles in Antalya and Doboj while improving his ATP Singles Ranking to 559 and his ITF World Tour Singles Ranking to 52 by mid-May. “I had a fair bit of time off, so after coming back it takes longer to get into the swing of things,” O'Connell, said. “I finally feel like I'm starting to find a bit of form and get more comfortable on the court."

Reaching an ITF World Tour singles ranking of 5 and leading the Tour in Finals made with 10, O'Connell returned to the ATP Challenger Tour in July recording wins in San Benedetto, Sopot and Tampere, most notably defeating former world number 5 Tommy Robredo in straight sets in their second round clash at the 2019 BNP Paribas Sopot Open. Adjusting back to the Challenger Tour quickly, O'Connell made a breakthrough at the 2019 Internazionali di Tennis del Friuli Venezia Giulia in Cordenons, Italy, claiming his first Challenger Tour title with a straight sets victory over German Jeremy Jahn in the final. With his maiden title, O'Connell's ATP Tour ranking improved from 313 to 220 in men's singles. In September, O'Connell reached the final of Sibiu Challenger, which saw his ranking inside the top 200 for the first time.

In October, O'Connell defeated American Steve Johnson in straight sets to claim his second Challenger title of the year to at the 2019 Fairfield Challenger in Fairfield, California. Speaking of O'Connell's performance, four time ATP champion and former world No. 21 Johnson said: "I thought he played some of the best tennis of his life. Too good. And when that happens, you say ‘too good’ and move on." O'Connell then followed his title with a series of strong results on the Challenger Tour, making semi-finals in Las Vegas and Houston & a final in Knoxville where he was defeated by Michael Mmoh in straight sets.

He finished 2019 with a singles ranking of 119, a career-high.

2020: First Grand Slam match win
In January, O'Connell reached the quarter final of the 2020 Bendigo Challenger. O'Connell was awarded a wildcard into the 2020 Australian Open, where he lost in four sets to 3rd seed Daniil Medvedev. In February, O'Connell reached the semi-final of the 2020 Challenger Banque Nationale de Drummondville, before the COVID-19 shutdown.

Upon recommencement, O'Connell won his first grand slam match, defeating Laslo Djere at the 2020 US Open. O'Connell finished 2020 with a singles rank of 120.

2021: First ATP quarterfinal
O'Connell commenced 2021 at the 2021 Great Ocean Road Open, where he reached the second round.

The following week having been awarded a third wildcard at the Australian Open, O'Connell achieved an upset first round victory against Jan-Lennard Struff before falling to Moldovan Radu Albot in the second round.

In his first participation in his career in the main draw at the French Open as a wildcard, O'Connell lost in the first round to Tommy Paul in a tight five sets match. In June, he also qualified for the first time in his career for the Wimbledon main draw, where he lost in the first round to No. 13 seed Gael Monfils.

In July, O'Connell qualified for and won his fourth and fifth career ATP main draw matches at the Atlanta Open. In Atlanta, O'Connell reached his first ATP quarterfinal and registered his first win over a top 30 player, defeating Jannik Sinner in the second round. He would end up losing to John Isner in the quarterfinals. Following the US Open, O'Connell reached the final of the Saint-Tropez Challenger. O'Connell finished 2021 with a singles rank of 175.

2022: Australian Open third round in singles & doubles, top 100, first ATP semifinal 
O'Connell was awarded a fourth wildcard into the 2022 Australian Open. He defeated Hugo Gaston in the first round. He reached the third round of a Grand Slam for the first time in his career defeating thirteenth seed Diego Schwartzman in straight sets. He would lose to American Maxime Cressy in the third round. As a result he returned to the top 150 at World No. 147 on 31 January 2022.

O'Connell qualified for Dubai, where he lost to Andy Murray in the first round, despite winning the first set.

O'Connell won his 12th challenger title in Split, after Zsombor Piros retired in the final trailing 0–2 in the second set after O'Connell won the first. He also upset Albert Ramos-Viñolas after qualifying for Geneva before losing to 4th seed Reilly Opelka in the second round.

He received a second consecutive wildcard for the 2022 French Open in May. He made his top 100 debut on 18 July 2022 following the 2022 Wimbledon Championships where he did not participate.

He reached his first ATP semifinal at the 2022 San Diego Open defeating eight seed JJ Wolf and second seed Jenson Brooksby.

O'Connell finished 2022 with an ATP singles ranking of No. 79.

2023
At the 2023 Qatar ExxonMobil Open he reached the quarterfinals defeating defending champion and fifth seed Roberto Bautista Agut for his third top-30 win.

Personal
O'Connell is a supporter of English football club Crystal Palace F.C.

Challenger and ITF/World Tennis Tour finals

Singles: 25 (13–12)

Doubles

Performance timelines

Singles
Current through the 2022 Australian Open

Doubles

Record against top 10 players
O'Connell's record against players who have been ranked in the top 10, with those who are active in boldface. Only ATP Tour main draw matches are considered:

References

External links

 
 
 

Australian male tennis players
1994 births
Living people
Tennis players from Sydney